Ivan Telesmanić (18 January 1920 – 25 June 2001) was a Croatian rower. He competed in the men's eight event at the 1948 Summer Olympics.

References

1920 births
2001 deaths
Croatian male rowers
Olympic rowers of Yugoslavia
Rowers at the 1948 Summer Olympics
People from Zadar County